The 3rd Sikh Pioneers was a regiment of the British Indian Army formed in 1922, when the Indian army moved from single battalion regiments to multi-battalion regiments.  The 3rd Sikh Pioneers were one of four Pioneer units in the 1922 reorganisation, including the 1st Madras Pioneers, 2nd Bombay Pioneers, and 4th Hazara Pioneers.

Brief history
The 3rd Sikh Pioneers was formed with the merging of its three sister regiments of the Sikh Pioneers; the 23rd Sikh Pioneers, 32nd Sikh Pioneers and the 34th Royal Sikh Pioneers in 1921. In 1929 the 3rd Sikh Pioneers was renamed the Corps of Sikh Pioneers.

References

British Indian Army infantry regiments
Indian Sikhs
Military units and formations established in 1922